Heavenly Nomadic ( — Sutak) is a 2015 Kyrgyz drama film directed by Mirlan Abdykalykov. The film was selected as the Kyrgyz entry for the Best Foreign Language Film at the 88th Academy Awards but it was not nominated.

Cast
 Taalaikan Abazova as Shaiyr
 Tabyldy Aktanov as Tabyldy
 Jibek Baktybekova as Umsunai
 Jenish Kangeldiev as Ermek
 Anar Nazarkulova as Karachach
 Myrza Subanbekov as Ulan

See also
 List of submissions to the 88th Academy Awards for Best Foreign Language Film
 List of Kyrgyz submissions for the Academy Award for Best Foreign Language Film

References

External links
 

2015 films
2015 drama films
Kyrgyzstani drama films
Kyrgyz-language films